Craig Blais (born 1978) is an American poet and academic. He is an associate professor of English at Anna Maria College.

Early life and education 
Blais was born in Springfield, Massachusetts. He earned an Associate of Arts in liberal arts from Holyoke Community College, a Bachelor of Art in English from the University of San Francisco, a Master of Fine Arts in creative writing from Wichita State University, and a Ph.D. in English from Florida State University.

Career 
Blais's first book About Crows won the 2013 Felix Pollak Prize in Poetry judged by Terrance Hayes and published by the University of Wisconsin Press. About Crows was awarded Gold Medal in the category of poetry in the 2014 Florida Book Awards competition. His second book Moon News was selected by former Poet Laureate of the United States Billy Collins as finalist for the Miller Williams Poetry Prize, to be published by the University of Arkansas Press in 2021.

His poems have appeared in Best New Poets, The Antioch Review, Barrow Street, Hayden's Ferry Review, Los Angeles Review, New Welsh Review, The Southern Review, and other places. He is associate professor of English at Anna Maria College in Paxton, Massachusetts.

Works 

 About Crows (2013)
 Moon News (2021)

References

External links 
 Craig Blais on Poetry Daily, June 23, 2013
 University of Wisconsin Press Author Page
 "Fishbone Novena", October 2013, New Orleans Review
 Poem: "Sonnet (as an excuse to publish a story from when I was ten)"
 Poem: "Oh Lovely Rock (A Sonnet with a Phone Number in It)"
 Craig Blais's personal website
 University of Arkansas Press Author Page

1978 births
Living people
Poets from Massachusetts
University of San Francisco alumni
Anna Maria College faculty
Wichita State University alumni
Florida State University alumni
Writers from Springfield, Massachusetts
21st-century American poets
Holyoke Community College alumni